Nice and Nicely Done is the fifth studio album by The Spinto Band, released on June 7, 2005 in North America and April 7, 2006 worldwide.

Track listing

Release history

References

2005 albums
The Spinto Band albums